Blue Wing Airlines n.v. is an airline with its head office on the grounds of Zorg en Hoop Airport in Paramaribo, Suriname. The airline started operations in January 2002 and operates charter and scheduled services from Paramaribo to destinations in the interior of Suriname, Guyana, Brazil, Venezuela and the Caribbean area. Its main base is Zorg en Hoop Airport. The airline is on the list of air carriers banned in the EU for safety violations. They were temporarily removed from the list on 28 November 2007 after implementing a corrective action plan ordered by the EU Transportation Commission. However, on 6 July 2010, the airline was banned again from European and French territory airspace as a result of three accidents involving Blue Wing Airlines: one on 3 April 2008 with 19 fatalities, another accident on 15 October 2009 that led to four unspecified injuries, and a third incident on 15 May 2010 with 8 fatalities.

Blue Wing is currently neither reaching the IOSA minimum level of certification nor the EU one.

Currently, Blue Wings performs cargo as well as commercial flights to the interior of Suriname and the surrounding region.

Fatal accidents and safety concerns
PZ-TGP & PZ-TGQ (Cessna U206G, Stationairs 6) and PZ-TGW (Antonov 28) became the first aircraft of Blue Wing Airlines (named after the Blue Wing, a local bird). In January 2002, Blue Wing started operations from Zorg en Hoop airfield in Paramaribo with managing director Amichand Jhauw. It was started with domestic operations to the many small strips Suriname is owing to mining activities. In the meantime also scheduled services to neighbor Guyana and French Guiana were offered. During 2004 and 2005, four Antonov 28s were added to the fleet. Earlier, another former ITA Cessna U206G (PZ-TLV) was put into service. In May 2006, the Antonovs were the only aircraft capable of operating from the inland strips during the severe flooding and were extensively used for relief flights. After a series of safety violations, plane crashes and insufficient responses to investigators, Blue Wing was put on the European Union blacklist of unsafe airlines in 2010. The French aviation authority banned all activities of Blue Wing Airlines over French territory on 1 June 2010, after finding “verified evidence of serious non-compliances with the specific safety standards established by the Chicago Convention” and that "neither the response of the competent authorities of Suriname nor of Blue Wing Airlines permitted to identify the root cause of the accidents and the safety deficiencies observed in ramp inspections.” In addition, the European Commission stated: "The overall number of accidents experienced by this air carrier in the last two years raises serious safety concerns whilst it has been impossible to learn the lessons of the previous accidents in the absence of any official accident investigation report."

Local authorities have not completed an investigation into the crashes. The airline contends that the accidents were caused by inadequate infrastructure at the often uncertified inland airstrips they operated from and the absence of Ground Proximity Warning Systems (GPWS) on board the Blue Wing aircraft. While Blue Wing has never operated in Europe, the airline did operate in French Guiana, which is why they were subject to French and EU transport authorities.

On April 3, 2008, Blue Wing Airlines lost an Antonov An-28 PZ-TSO during a go-around at the Lawa Antino Airstrip in Benzdorp, Suriname.  The aircraft crashed into the jungle about 150 meters next to the airstrip and burst into flames. All 19 occupants were killed. Among the victims was pilot Soeriani Verkuijl, wife of Blue Wing's Managing Director Amichand Jhauw. Only in late October 2008 was the Flight Data Recorder discovered during a reconstruction of the wreck.

On October 15, 2009 a second Antonov An-28 was lost. The PZ-TST broke into two pieces after a hard landing in Kwamelasemoetoe, in the south of Suriname. All eight occupants survived, with four suffering unspecified injuries. Finally, a third Blue Wing Antonov An-28 (PZ-TSV) crashed on May 15, 2010 near Poeketi. All 6 passengers and two crew perished, grounding the remaining two Antonovs (PZ-TSA, which is the re-registered PZ-TGW & PZ-TSN) of Blue Wing indefinitely.

Fleet renewal and expansion
In 2007, a Cessna 208 Caravan I (PZ-TSB) was added to the fleet, while at the end of 2007 the first DHC-6 Twin Otter (PZ-TSD) was purchased. During November 2008, again a new aircraft type was added to the fleet when a Reims/Cessna F406 Caravan II (PZ-TSF) arrived. This aircraft is operated as an “executive transport”. Furthermore, a few weeks later, a second DHC-6 Twin Otter (PZ-TSH) was purchased in Australia. In 2010, a Cessna 208B Grand Caravan (PZ-TSK) was added to the fleet, and in March 2015 another Cessna 208B Grand Caravan (PZ-TSL) was the latest addition to the Blue Wing Airlines fleet.

Fleet

 
The Blue Wing Airlines fleet consists of the following aircraft (as of 16 August 2014):

Accidents and incidents
 In a 3 April 2008 accident, an Antonov An-28, registration PZ-TSO crashed upon landing at the Lawa Antino Airstrip of Benzdorp in southeastern Suriname. The plane carried 17 passengers and a crew of two; all were killed.
 On 15 October 2009, another Antonov An-28, registration PZ-TST, was damaged beyond repair while landing at the Kwamelasemoetoe airstrip close to the Trio Indian village in the south of Suriname on an interior flight from Zorg en Hoop Airport. Of the 8 persons on-board only one crewmember and 3 passengers were slightly injured.
The two pilots and six passengers died. The plane had taken off from Godo Holo Airstrip.

References

External links

 
 Blue Wing Airlines

Airlines banned in the European Union
Airlines of Suriname
Airlines established in 2002
2002 establishments in Suriname
Paramaribo
Companies of Suriname